John Covert may refer to:
John Covert (painter), American painter
John Covert (by 1501–58), MP for Sussex and New Shoreham
John S. Covert (died 1881), shipbuilder and politician
Sir John Covert, 1st Baronet (1620–1679), MP for Horsham

See also
John Covert Boyd (1850–1924), Naval surgeon and fraternity founder
Covert (disambiguation)